A stretch-shortening cycle (SSC) is an active stretch (eccentric contraction) of a muscle followed by an immediate shortening (concentric contraction) of that same muscle.

Research studies

The increased performance benefit associated with muscle contractions that take place during SSCs has been the focus of much research in order to determine the true nature of this enhancement. At present, there is some debate as to where and how this performance enhancement takes place. It has been postulated that elastic structures in series with the contractile component can store energy like a spring after being forcibly stretched. Since the length of the tendon increases due to the active stretch phase, if the series elastic component acts as a spring, it would therefore be storing more potential energy. This energy would be released as the tendon shortened. Thus, the recoil of the tendon during the shortening phase of the movement would result in a more efficient movement than one in which no energy had been stored.  This research is further supported by Roberts et al.

However, other studies have found that removing portions of these series-elastic components (by way of tendon length reduction) had little effect on muscle performance.

Studies on turkeys have, nevertheless, shown that during SSC, a performance enhancement associated with elastic energy storage still takes place but it is thought that the aponeurosis could be a major source of energy storage (Roleveld et al., 1994).
The contractile component itself has also been associated with the ability to increase contractile performance through muscle potentiation 
while other studies have found that this ability is quite limited and unable to account for such enhancements (Lensel and Goubel, 1987, Lensel-Corbeil and Goubel, 1990; Ettema and Huijing, 1989).

Community agreement

The results of these often contradictory studies have been associated with improved efficiencies for human or animal movements such as counter-movement jumps and running. However it is still not established why and how this enhancement takes place.  It is one of the underlying mechanisms of plyometric training.

See also 
 plyometrics

References

Exercise physiology